The 2013 South Carolina Gamecocks football team represented the University of South Carolina in the 2013 NCAA Division I FBS football season. The Gamecocks competed as a member of the Southeastern Conference (SEC) as part of its East Division. The team was led by head coach Steve Spurrier, in his ninth year, and played its home games at Williams-Brice Stadium in Columbia, South Carolina.

The 2013 Gamecocks finished the season ranked No. 4 in the AP Poll. This remains the highest final ranking in school history.

Schedule

Source:

Players

Depth chart
Projected starters and primary backups versus Mississippi State on November 2, 2013.

Awards
 A.J. Cann – SEC Offensive Lineman of the Week, 9/30/13
 Mike Davis – AgSouth Athlete of the Week, 9/30/13
 Elliott Fry – SEC Special Teams Player of the Week, 10/28/13; SEC Freshman of the Week, 11/18/13
 Victor Hampton – SEC Defensive Player of the Week, 11/4/13
 Kelcy Quarles – SEC Defensive Lineman of the Week, 10/28/13
 Connor Shaw – AgSouth Athlete of the Week, 9/16/13; AgSouth Athlete of the Week, 10/28/13; Davey O'Brien Quarterback of the Week, 10/28/13; SEC Offensive Player of the Week, 10/28/13
 Clayton Stadnik – SEC Offensive Lineman of the Week, 9/16/13

Game summaries

North Carolina

Georgia

Vanderbilt

UCF

Kentucky

Arkansas

Tennessee

Missouri

Mississippi State

Florida

Coastal Carolina

Clemson

Wisconsin (Capital One Bowl)

Rankings

Coaching staff

 Steve Spurrier – Head coach
 Lorenzo Ward – Defensive coordinator
 Deke Adams – Defensive line coach
 Kirk Botkin – Linebackers, spurs coach
 Grady Brown – Secondary coach, assistant special teams coordinator
 Shawn Elliott – Co-offensive coordinator, offensive line coach
 G.A. Mangus – Quarterbacks coach
 Joe Robinson – Special teams coordinator, tight ends coach
 Everette Sands – Running backs coach
 Steve Spurrier, Jr. – Recruiting coordinator, wide receivers coach

References

South Carolina
South Carolina Gamecocks football seasons
Citrus Bowl champion seasons
South Carolina Gamecocks football